Gemelliporidra is a genus of bryozoans belonging to the family Hippaliosinidae.

The species of this genus are found in Central America.

Species:

Gemelliporidra aculeata 
Gemelliporidra belikina 
Gemelliporidra circumvestiens 
Gemelliporidra colombiensis 
Gemelliporidra lata 
Gemelliporidra magniporosa 
Gemelliporidra multilamellosa 
Gemelliporidra ornatissima 
Gemelliporidra pertusa 
Gemelliporidra typica

References

Bryozoan genera